The North Pilbara Football League is an Australian rules football competition based in Karratha and Port Hedland in Western Australia.

History of Football in the Pilbara
In 1977 the De Grey Football Association (based around Port Hedland) and West Pilbara Football League (based around Karratha) merged to form the De Gray West Pilbara Football League.

In 1983 there was a name change to North Pilbara Football League.

Clubs

Current

Former

2006 ladder

2007 ladder

2008 ladder

2009 ladder

2010 ladder

2011 ladder

2012 ladder

2013 ladder

2014 ladder

2015 ladder

2016 ladder

2017 ladder

2018 ladder

2019 ladder

References

Website

Official website

Further reading 
 A Way of Life - The Story of country football in Western Australia - Alan East

Australian rules football competitions in Western Australia
Sport in Pilbara